Monday Morning is a 2002 French comedy film directed by Otar Iosseliani.

Awards
At the 2002 Berlin International Film Festival the film won the following awards:
 Silver Bear for Best Director for Otar Iosseliani
 FIPRESCI award

References

External links 

2002 comedy films
2002 films
French comedy films
Films directed by Otar Iosseliani
2000s French films